Ezekiel Roy Lambert Jr. (June 18, 1925 – February 22, 2008) was an American politician. He served as a Democratic member for the 66th and 112th district of the Georgia House of Representatives. He also served as a member of the Georgia State Senate.

Life and career 
Lambert was born in Morgan County, Georgia, the son of Lula McLendon and Ezekiel Roy Lambert Sr. He attended Tulane University and the University of Georgia. He served in the United States Navy during World War II.

Lambert was elected to the Georgia State Senate, serving two separate terms from 1955 to 1956 and from 1961 to 1962. In 1963, he was elected to represent the 112th district of the Georgia House of Representatives. He served until 1983, when he was succeeded by Ward Edwards. The same year, he was elected to the 66th district, serving until 1985, when he was succeeded by Frank E. Stancil.

Lambert died in February 2008, at the age of 82.

References 

1925 births
2008 deaths
People from Morgan County, Georgia
Democratic Party Georgia (U.S. state) state senators
Democratic Party members of the Georgia House of Representatives
20th-century American politicians
Tulane University alumni
University of Georgia alumni
United States Navy personnel of World War II